Budsabakorn "Nook" Sukapan (born: 11 September 1997) is a Thai professional golfer playing on the LPGA of Japan Tour. As an amateur, she was a dual medalist in the 2014 Asian Games, winning a silver in the women's individual event, and the first ever gold medal for Thailand in the women's team event with Benyapa Niphatsophon and Supamas Sangchan.

Early life 
Sukapan was born on 11 September 1997 in Chiang Rai, Thailand. Sukapan started playing golf at the age of 9 years old. Her hobbies include watching movies and listening to music.

Amateur career 
Sukapan secured a gold medal at the 2014 Asian Games in the women's team event with Benyapa Niphatsophon and Supamas Sangchan which was the first gold medal to be earned by Thailand in women's golf event at the Asian Games. She also went on to win a silver in the women's individual event.

Professional career 
Sukapan turned professional in 2014. She captured her first career China LPGA Tour win at the 2015 Srixon XXIO Ladies Open.

In December 2015, Sukapan finished tied for 2nd at the final stage LPGA Qualifying Tournament to earn LPGA Membership for the 2016 season. In the 2016 LPGA Tour, she played 19 events and made five cuts.

In 2019, Sukapan played in the JLPGA Step Up Tour and won 4 titles. She finished first in money ranking and earned a tour card for the 2020 LPGA of Japan Tour.

Amateur wins 
2013 Singha Thailand Amateur Open, Road to Panasonic Open Singha Championship, Malaysian Junior Open
2014 Singapore Junior Championship, Dutch International Junior Open

Source:

Professional wins (8)

China LPGA Tour wins (2) 
2015 (2) Srixon XXIO Ladies Open, CTBC Ladies Open

Taiwan LPGA Tour wins (1) 
2015 (1) CTBC Ladies Open

JLPGA Step Up Tour wins (4) 
2019 (4) Udon-Ken Ladies, Shizu Hills Ladies Mori Building Cup, KCFG Ladies Golf Tournament, Hanasaka Ladies Yanmar Golf Tournament

Thai LPGA Tour wins (2) 
 2017 (1) 7th Singha-SAT-Toyota Thai LPGA Championship
2014 (1) 2nd Singha-SAT Thai LPGA Championship

References

External links 

Budsabakorn Sukapan
LPGA of Japan Tour golfers
Budsabakorn Sukapan
Budsabakorn Sukapan
Budsabakorn Sukapan
Asian Games medalists in golf
Medalists at the 2014 Asian Games
Golfers at the 2014 Asian Games
1997 births
Living people
Budsabakorn Sukapan